Zeyarat-e Bala (also Romanized as Zeyārat-e Bālā; also known as Zeyārat) is a village in Jamabrud Rural District, in the Central District of Damavand County, Tehran Province, Iran. At the 2006 census, its population was 97, in 45 families.

References 

Populated places in Damavand County